The 1978 Thessaloniki earthquake occurred on 20 June at . The shock registered 6.5 on the moment magnitude scale, had a maximum Mercalli intensity of VIII (Severe), and was felt throughout northern Greece, Yugoslavia and Bulgaria. It was the largest event in the area since the 1932 Ierissos earthquake.

It was the first earthquake that hit a big city in Greece in Modern times. It is estimated that 49 people died, 37 of which were living in the same block of flats in the city center that collapsed. More than 220 people were injured and many thousands were left homeless. 3170 buildings (4.5%) were found to have severe damages (red label), 13918 buildings (21.0%) had moderate damages (yellow label), and 49071 buildings (74.5%) were found to have no damages (green label), as per the assessment of the Greek authorities.

There have also been some recorded damages in various local archaeological monuments, such as the Arch of Galerius and Rotunda and the Church of the Acheiropoietos.

See also
List of earthquakes in Greece

References

External links
 Significant earthquakes of the world - 1978 – United States Geological Survey
 

Modern history of Thessaloniki
Earthquakes in Greece
1978 in Greece
1978 earthquakes
June 1978 events in Europe
1978 disasters in Greece